The ABSA Centre, renamed Foreshore Place, is a mixed-use skyscraper in Cape Town, South Africa.

History 
Construction works were completed in 1970. The building originally housed a five-star hotel, and was known as the Heerengracht Hotel. It was later purchased by the predecessor to the ABSA banking group and converted to offices.

In 2019, work began to redevelop the building as premium mixed-use residential and office space. It was renamed to Foreshore Place.

Description 
It consists of a four-storey podium and a 29-storey tower block characterised by a concrete central core. Its continuous glass curtain wall façades were the first of their kind in Cape Town.

References

External links

Skyscrapers in Cape Town
Skyscraper office buildings in South Africa